Whitley is a village in the civil parish of Melksham Without, Wiltshire, England. It had a population of 1,914 in the 2011 census. This parish was formed in Local Government Act of 1894, when Whitley was united with the nearby settlements of Beanacre and Shaw, which are all primarily residential and agricultural communities. The hamlet of West Hill is to the west, on the road to Atworth.

History
The manor of Whitley was recorded in the 13th century and became a tithing of Melksham parish.  The village name means a "white clearing" in a wood. It consists of three settlements, Upper, Middle and Lower Whitley, linked by the Atworth to Lacock road.  Whitley House dates from the late seventeenth century. Whitley Farmhouse, Slade's Farmhouse and the Pear Tree Inn all date to the late seventeenth century, and Westlands Farmhouse and Northey's Farmhouse to the early eighteenth. Cottages were added to the village throughout the eighteenth and nineteenth centuries, but substantial infill only took place in the twentieth century. Lower Whitley, around Westlands Farm, remains relatively undeveloped.

Amenities
A Methodist chapel was built in 1828 and replaced by a new building at Top Lane in 1867. As of 2015 this building continues in regular use as Whitley Methodist Church, having been altered and extended in 1985 and 2013. The village has no church but since 1838 has been served by Christ Church at nearby Shaw.

Whitley has a cycle repair shop/ village shop and tea room called Spindles, opening in August 2021;a golf club and a pub, the Pear Tree Inn, dating from the late 17th century with a 19th-century interior. There is a village hall, the Reading Rooms, built in 1904.

References

External links
 

Melksham Without
Villages in Wiltshire